Hawaiian Acres is a census-designated place (CDP) in Hawaii County, Hawaii, United States located in the District of Puna. The population was 2,700 at the 2010 census, up from 1,776 at the 2000 census.

Geography
Hawaiian Acres is located on the eastern side of the island of Hawaii at  (19.548868, -155.055861). It is bordered to the east by Ainaloa and Orchidlands Estates, to the north by Kurtistown, to the northwest by Mountain View, and to the west by Fern Acres. To the south is the Puna Forest Reserve.

Demographics

As of the census of 2000, there were 1,776 people, 698 households, and 423 families residing in the CDP. The racial makeup of the CDP was 51.01% White, 1.41% African American, 0.62% Native American, 9.85% Asian, 8.67% Pacific Islander, 1.35% from other races, and 27.08% from two or more races. Hispanic or Latino of any race were 9.85% of the population.

There were 698 households, out of which 33.1% had children under the age of 18 living with them, 40.7% were married couples living together, 11.7% had a female householder with no husband present, and 39.3% were non-families. 30.5% of all households were made up of individuals, and 3.0% had someone living alone who was 65 years of age or older. The average household size was 2.54 and the average family size was 3.22.

In the CDP the population was spread out, with 28.9% under the age of 18, 6.3% from 18 to 24, 29.7% from 25 to 44, 28.5% from 45 to 64, and 6.6% who were 65 years of age or older. The median age was 38 years. For every 100 females, there were 110.2 males. For every 100 females age 18 and over, there were 114.4 males.

The median income for a household in the CDP was $30,039, and the median income for a family was $35,726. Males had a median income of $30,385 versus $24,375 for females. The per capita income for the CDP was $16,242.  About 22.5% of families and 28.1% of the population were below the poverty line, including 36.0% of those under age 18 and 22.0% of those age 65 or over.

References

External links
 Hawaiian Acres Community Association

Census-designated places in Hawaii County, Hawaii
Populated places on Hawaii (island)